Jeff C. Siddoway (born October 21, 1948) was a Republican member of the Idaho Senate, representing the 35th district from 2006 through 2018.

Early life, education and career 
Jeff Siddoway was born in Rexburg, Idaho, and attended South Fremont High School in St. Anthony and University of Idaho.

Siddoway is currently a farmer/owner of Juniper Mountain Ranch of sheep, elk, and bison.

He is married to Cindy Butts and is a father to three children: Billie Jean, Jodie, and J. C.

Committees
2016

Local Government & Taxation – Chair

Resources & Environment

State Affairs

Elections

Siddoway supported Fmr. Governor Mitt Romney for 2012 Republican Party presidential primaries.

Organizations 
 President of Fremont Wool Growers Association
 Former President, Idaho Wool Growers Association

References

Republican Party Idaho state senators
University of Idaho alumni
Living people
1948 births
People from Rexburg, Idaho
21st-century American politicians